Almonte is a town and municipality located in the province of Huelva, Spain. According to the 2010 census, the city has a population of 23,000 inhabitants. The village of El Rocío, an important pilgrimage point, is located within the municipality.

Demographics

References

External links
Almonte - Sistema de Información Multiterritorial de Andalucía
- AlmonteAlDia.com - Digital News for Almonte, El Rocío and Matalascañas

Municipalities in the Province of Huelva